Carlos Cardús Carrió  (born 26 September 1959 in Barcelona) is a former Grand Prix motorcycle road racer.

Cardús had his best year in 1990 when he won four races and finished second in the 250cc world championship to John Kocinski in a close battle that went down to the last race of the season. In the last race of the year at Phillip Island in Australia, Cardús only needed to finish in second place behind Kocinski to win the world championship, however, his gear shift lever broke and he lost the title. He competed in the World Superbike Championship in 1994.

Carlos is the uncle of Ricard Cardús.

Motorcycle Grand Prix Results
Points system from 1969 to 1987:

Points system from 1988 to 1992:

(key) (Races in bold indicate pole position; races in italics indicate fastest lap)

References
Carlos Cardús career statistics at MotoGP.com

1959 births
Living people
Motorcycle racers from Catalonia
Spanish motorcycle racers
250cc World Championship riders
Superbike World Championship riders
Sportspeople from Barcelona